The simple-station Hospital is part of the TransMilenio mass-transit system of Bogotá, Colombia, opened in the year 2000.

Location

The station is located in the city center, specifically at Avenida Caracas with Calles 3 and 4.

History

At the beginning of 2001, the second phase of the Caracas trunk was opened from Tercer Milenio to Calle 40 Sur. A few months later, service was extended south to Portal de Usme.

The station received the name Hospital for its proximity to the five medical centers (San Juan de Dios, Santa Clara, La Misericordia, Materno Infantil, and La Samaritana) that are better known as Ciudad Salud, or Health City.

Station Services

Old trunk services

Current Trunk Services

Feeder routes

This station does not have connections to feeder routes.

Inter-city service

This station does not have inter-city service.

External links
TransMilenio

See also
Bogotá
TransMilenio
List of TransMilenio Stations

TransMilenio
2001 establishments in Colombia